The Nordic Tournament was an annual ski jumping tournament that was a part of the FIS Ski Jumping World Cup. The tournament started in 1997 as a counterpart to the widely successful Four Hills Tournament in Germany and Austria. It is held in March in Finland and Norway, earlier even in Sweden.

Hills

Other hills
Falun K-115, HS-128
Lillehammer K-123, HS-138
Vikersund K-185, HS-207

Winners

References

 
Recurring sporting events established in 1997
Ski jumping competitions
Ski jumping competitions in Norway
Ski jumping competitions in Finland
Ski jumping competitions in Sweden
February sporting events
March sporting events
1997 establishments in Europe
FIS Ski Jumping World Cup